Tiger Shroff (born 2 March 1990) is an Indian actor, mixed martial arts promoter, singer and dancer in Mumbai, Maharashtra  known for his work in the Indian cinema. He is best known for his Baaghi action franchise, Heropanti (2014) and War (2019). He has featured in Forbes India Celebrity 100 list since 2018.

He made his film debut with the 2014 action romantic film Heropanti which became a commercial success and earned him several awards including Stardust Awards For Superstar of Tomorrow – Male and IIFA Awards For Star Debut of the Year – Male. 

In 2019 he founded mixed martial arts promotion, Matrix Fight Night (MFN). As of February 2023 it had held 10 live events in India and UAE. His mother is co-founder and owner of this promotion. MFN is considered as India's biggest MMA promotion.

Early life 
Jai Hemant Shroff was born on 2 March 1990, to Indian film actor Jackie Shroff and his wife Ayesha Shroff (née Dutt). He has a younger sister named Krishna Shroff. On his paternal side, he is of Gujarati and Turkmen ancestry while from his maternal side, he is of Bengali and Belgian descent.

Shroff is a devout Hindu devotee of Lord Shiva and has attributed his physique to Lord Shiva. He holds a fast every Monday and during every Mahashivaratri festival. He studied at the American School of Bombay.

Due to his experience in martial arts, he has frequently spent time helping other actors train for films. In 2014, he was awarded an honorary fifth degree black belt in Taekwondo.

Career

Early career (2012–2017) 

In June 2012, Shroff was signed by producer Sajid Nadiadwala to make his film debut in Sabbir Khan's action romantic comedy Heropanti. To prepare for the role, he took flexibility training under Ziley Mawai. Released on 23 May 2014, and made on a final budget of 250 million Indian Rupees, Heropanti was a commercial success with gross of  worldwide and became a HIT film. He gained praise for his dancing skills, action sequences, tough physique and for the ability to perform onerous stunts, but was also criticised for his acting, looks and dialogue delivery. Taran Adarsh of Bollywood Hungama appreciated his performance, saying "Tiger registers an impact in several sequences" and that he "scores brownie points in action and stunts". Adarsh also added that "for a first-timer, he exudes supreme confidence". Subhash K. Jha praised him for his versatility, saying that "he emotes, he dances and yes, he can fight". However, Sweta Kaushal of Hindustan Times disagreed, calling his "dialogues forced" and said "his expressions do nothing in a given situation". In spite of terming his performance "a little unconvincing", Kaushal called his action sequences "admirable" and said he's a "great dancer". Shroff's portrayal fetched him the Screen Award for Best Male Debut and the IIFA Award for Star Debut of the Year – Male in addition to a nomination in the same category at the 60th Filmfare Awards.

In 2015, His album “Zindagi Aa Raha Hoon Main” was released, and that album was a big hit. It featured Atif Aslam and was directed by Ahmed Khan. Shroff was praised for his dance skills in the album.

In 2016, Shroff reteamed with Nadiadwala and Sabbir in Baaghi (2016), set against the backdrop of a martial arts school while also featuring Shraddha Kapoor and Sudheer Babu. Earning  in worldwide markets, Baaghi was his first big hit. Tiger Shroff was praised for his actions, stunts and tough physique. Bollywood Hungama praised his action sequences, saying: "The action Tiger performed without use of double body is delight to see." That year he also played a martial arts teacher who gains superpowers, in Remo D'Souza's superhero film A Flying Jatt alongside Jacqueline Fernandez. In 2017, Shroff teamed with Sabbir for the third time in the dance film Munna Michael opposite Nidhhi Agerwal. However, both A Flying Jatt and Munna Michael were unsuccessful at the box office.

Establishment and recognition (2018–present) 

In 2018, Shroff achieved a turning point in his career and established himself in the industry with Ahmed Khan's Baaghi 2, a spiritual sequel to Baaghi, and the second installment of the Baaghi Film Series  opposite Disha Patani. Produced by Nadiadwala, the film featured him as a rebellious army officer set on the mission to find his ex-girlfriend's missing daughter. Surpassing initial predictions, Baaghi 2 grossed  net domestically in India and over  worldwide to become one of the top-grossing Bollywood films of the year.

After the blockbuster success of Baaghi 2, Tiger Shroff's album “Get Ready to Move” was released in 2018. The album was also a hit.

In 2019, Shroff appeared in Punit Malhotra's teen drama Student of the Year 2, his first mainstream romantic drama. Produced by Karan Johar's Dharma Productions, it was the sequel to Student of the Year and saw Shroff portray a college student who competes in an annual school championship. Rajeev Masand of News18 called his performance "the film's singular strength". Ronak Kotecha, from The Times of India, agreed by saying "Tiger Shroff pretty much carries the film on his well-toned shoulders". The film did decently well having a gross worldwide collection of ₹982 million. The expectations were higher but still managed to be a hit film overall.

In October 2019, Shroff starred in Siddharth Anand's action thriller War alongside Hrithik Roshan. The film was the highest-grossing Bollywood film of the year and ranks as Shroff's highest-grossing release as of that time and one of the biggest blockbuster films of Tiger Shroff's career. The Worldwide Collection for War was 4.75 billion Indian Rupees (US$63 Million) and 3.18 billion Indian Rupees nett domestically in India. War created an historic record by having the highest opening- day collection made by a Bollywood movie in India of over 53.35 crore Indian Rupees. The film emerged as a huge box office  and a blockbuster success, becoming the highest-grossing Indian film of 2019 and one of the highest-grossing Indian films of all time.

In March 2020, he starred in the third installment of the Baaghi film series titled Baaghi 3, where he reunited with Shraddha Kapoor.

After a break of one year, In April 2022, Shroff starred in Ahmed Khan's directional and his 2014's debut action film sequel Heropanti 2 where he reunited with Tara Sutaria. It received negative reviews from critics and audience. The film eventually became a box-office bomb. Taran Adarsh of Bollywood Hungama wrote, "Despite lavish production value and fantastic stunts by Shroff, Heropanti 2 suffers from a poor storyline". Heropanti 2 grossed ₹29.11 crore in India and worldwide gross collection of ₹35.13 crore.

He was set to portray Rambo in the Hindi reboot of the Rambo franchise, and the film was supposed to be directed by Siddharth Anand. The project is delayed since 2017.

Tiger Shroff will now be seen In Vikas Bahl’s Ganapath - Part 1 which is an Indian/Bollywood Action Thriller Film opposite Kriti Sanon and Amitabh Bachchan in a pivotal role. The film will be releasing in 2023 October 20th on the special occasion of Dussehra. Ganapath is planned as a multi-part project as of now. He will also be seen alongside Akshay Kumar and Prithviraj Sukumaran in Ali Abbas Zafar's Bade Miyan Chote Miyan releasing on Christmas 2023.

Other work 
In 2017, Shroff was brought in as Brand Ambassador and co-owner of Bengaluru Tigers, which is owned by 8K Miles Media Group. The Bengaluru Tigers won third place in the inaugural season of Super Fight League, the first mixed martial arts (MMA) League in India. In 2018, Shroff was also made the Brand Ambassador of Prowl. He is also the brand ambassador of big brands like Pepsi, ASICS India, Casio India, 8PM Premium Black, Macho, Garnier, Forca, Great White Electronic and many more.

Filmography

Films

Music videos

Discography

Awards and nominations

References

External links 

 
 
 

Living people
1990 births
Indian male film actors
21st-century Indian male actors
Male actors in Hindi cinema
Male actors from Mumbai
Gujarati people
Bengali people
Indian people of Turkic descent
Indian people of Belgian descent
Indian male taekwondo practitioners
Indian stunt performers
Indian Hindus
Indian Shaivites
Screen Awards winners
International Indian Film Academy Awards winners
Zee Cine Awards winners